Lydia Nāmāhāna Kekuaipiʻia (c. 1787 – 1829) was a wife of King Kamehameha I of Hawaii. She was the daughter of Keʻeaumoku Pāpaʻiahiahi, and her sisters Kaʻahumanu and Kalākua Kaheiheimālie were also Kamehameha's wives. Kamehameha and Kaʻahumanu later arranged Piʻia to marry Gideon Peleioholani Laʻanui, who was ten years her junior. They were married by Hiram Bingham I in a Christian ceremony.

Nāmāhāna Piʻia also served as Governor of Oahu.

Ancestry

References

Royalty of the Hawaiian Kingdom
House of Kamehameha
Hawaiian royal consorts
1780s births
1829 deaths
Governors of Oahu
Converts to Christianity from pagan religions
Hawaiian Kingdom Protestants
Native Hawaiian women in politics
Women governors and heads of sub-national entities
Remarried royal consorts